Vyšné nad Hronom is a village and municipality in the Levice District in the Nitra Region of Slovakia.

History
In historical records the village was first mentioned in 1264.

Geography
The village lies at an altitude of 152 metres and covers an area of 6.474 km². It has a population of about 195 people.

Ethnicity
The village is about 64% Magyar, 35% Slovak and 1% Gypsy.

Facilities
The village has a public library and football pitch.

External links
https://web.archive.org/web/20070513023228/http://www.statistics.sk/mosmis/eng/run.html

Villages and municipalities in Levice District